Huíla is a province of Angola. Lubango is the capital of the province. Basket-making is a significant industry in the province; many make baskets out of reeds.

History
From the Portuguese Colonial War (1961–1975) to Angola's independence, and the subsequent civil war in Angola (1975-2002) Huíla was directly affected only during relatively short periods of time. Cassinga was abandoned by its European supervisors, and the mine fell into neglect during the ensuing Angolan Civil War. The following year it was occupied by the People's Liberation Army of Namibia (PLAN), military wing of the South West African People's Organization. PLAN subsequently adopted Cassinga as a staging point for insurgent raids on South-West Africa, about 250 kilometres to the south. Their bases soon became a sanctuary for local refugees during the Namibian War of Independence.

In 1978, PLAN's presence in Cassinga attracted the attention of the South African Defence Force. Operation Reindeer saw paratroops of the 44 Parachute Regiment supported by bomber and strike aircraft launch an air assault on 4 May. The six-hour assault claimed approximately 600 lives, including four SADF soldiers, sixty Cuban soldiers and over five hundred PLAN combatants and  South West African  exiles. Cassinga was the site of more fighting during Operation Askari, in December 1983.

The post-colonial development in Angola has seen the establishment of two universities in Lubango (the state Universidade Mandume, named after a leader of the Ovambo in the fight against the occupation by the Portuguese, as well as a campus of the Universidade Privada de Angola. Tourism is emerging, largely involving white entrepreneurs from Namibia, which the provincial government is actively seeking to attract.

Geography
Huíla Province is traversed by the northwesterly line of equal longitude and latitude. The province is bordered on the west by the provinces of Namibe and Benguela, to the north by Bié and Cuando Cubango, and to the south by the province of Cunene. The winding road known as Leba Hill, as well as Bicauri National Park are in Huíla Province. Bicauri National Park was established in 1964 and covers an area of 790 km².

Municipalities
The province of Huíla contains fourteen municipalities:

Communes
The province of Huíla contains the following communes; sorted by their respective municipalities:

 Caconda Municipality: – Caconda, Cusse, Gungue (Gungui), Uaba (Waba)
 Cacula Municipality: – Cacula, Chicuaqueia (Tchiquaqueia), Chituto (Tchituto), Viti Vivali (Viti Vivale)
 Caluquembe Municipality: – Calépi (Kalépi), Caluquembe (Kalukembe), N'gola
 Chibia Municipality: – Capunda-Cavilongo, Chibia, Jau, Quihita
 Chicomba Municipality: – Chicomba, Cutenda (Kutenda); Libongue, Quê
 Chipindo Municipality: – Bambi, Chipindo; Bunjei
 Gambos Municipality: – Chiange, Chibemba (Chimbemba)
 Humpata Municipality: – Humpata; Bata-Bata, Caholo (Kaholo), Neves, Palanca
 Jamba Municipality: – Cassinga, Dongo, Jamba
 Kuvango Municipality: – Galangue, Kuvango (Cuvango), Vicungo
 Lubango Municipality: – Arimba, Hoque (Degola), Huíla, Lubango, Quilemba
 Matala Municipality: – Capelongo, Matala, Mulondo; Micosse
 Quilengues Municipality: – Dinde, Impulo, Quilengues
 Quipungo Municipality: – Quipungo; Cainda, Hombo (Ombo), Thicongo, Thicungo

Sports
Estádio de Militar Huíla, a multi-use stadium in Huila

Demographics

As of 2013, the province had a population of 2,609,486 people. The original inhabitants of the area were Khoisan, but only a few residual groups remain today, ousted from pastoral land by other groups. In some areas they represent under 2% of the population. Most pastoral farmers in the province are known Nyaneka-Khumbi, but do not form a whole ethnic group. A significant ethnic group in the province is the Mwila, who originally inhabited the plateau areas.

Favored by the relatively mild climate, there was a relatively strong colonization by Portuguese immigrants who sometimes mixed with the local population. This led to expansion and diversification of agriculture at the same time, but also to a growth of cities and towns. However, the influx of IDPs in the thousands during the war severely affected the province.
During the war, a considerable number of Ovimbundu fled to the highlands of the province of Huíla. In some areas they now represent some 37% of the population, with the largest concentration in the central highlands. There is now also a much smaller number of Bakongo who had been assimilated from the Congo, and some settled in the province upon their return. The Heroro represent about 0.5% of the population.

List of governors of Huila

References

External links

 Official website of province governor 
 Information on this province at the Angolan ministry for territorial administration
 Information on this province at Info Angola
 Province geographical info at geoview.info

 
Provinces of Angola